Pretty Girls Make Graves was a post-punk band formed in Seattle in 2001, named after The Smiths' song of the same name (which itself was named after a quote from Jack Kerouac's The Dharma Bums). Andrea Zollo and Derek Fudesco had played together previously in The Hookers, as well as The Death Wish Kids and Area 51 along with Dann Gallucci, with whom Derek had formed Murder City Devils. Not long before the Murder City Devils disbanded, Derek and Andrea formed Pretty Girls Make Graves along with Jay, Nick and Nathan. They played the Coachella Valley Music and Arts Festival in 2004. The band announced its split on January 29, 2007, with their final two shows taking place in Seattle that June.

History 
The band released their first EP on Dim Mak and Sound Virus Records before releasing their debut album Good Health on Lookout Records in April 2002. The band would later sign to Matador Records where they released The New Romance, and then later Elan Vital. Guitarist Nathan Thelen left Pretty Girls Make Graves in March 2004 to form Moonrats and Leona Marrs (formerly of HintHint) joined as a multi-instrumentalist. On January 29, 2007, the band announced that Nick had left the band and their May 2007 tour would be their last.

Members 

 Andrea Zollo – vocals (2001–2007)
 Derek Fudesco – bass, vocals (2001–2007)
 J. Clark – guitar, keyboards, samples, vocals (2001–2007)
 Nick Dewitt – drums, samples, keyboards, trumpet, vocals (2001–2007)
 Nathan Thelen – guitar, vocals (2001–2004)
 Leona Marrs – keyboards, accordion, vocals (2004–2007)

Post-breakup 
J. Clark formed Jaguar Love with former Blood Brothers members Johnny Whitney and  Cody Votolato. Clark is the drummer in the band. Jaguar Love signed with Matador Records, former home of Pretty Girls Make Graves. On February 18, 2009, it was announced Jay was no longer playing in the line up of Jaguar Love, being replaced with a drum machine on that tour.

Nick Dewitt continues working on his solo electronic project Dutch Dub. He also plays with Amy Blaschke in Night Canopy.

Derek Fudesco formed The Cave Singers with Pete Quirk of  Hint Hint and Marty Lund of Cobra High.

Soon after leaving Pretty Girls Make Graves, Nathan Thelen started Moonrats in Seattle together with keyboard player Aska Matsumiya and drummer Jason Echeverria. They moved to Los Angeles and released an EP on their own. They put out a full-length and a 7" on LA Record in 2008.

Andrea Zollo plays drums with Triumph of Lethargy Skinned Alive to Death, and also sings in Deep Creep with Derek Fudesco. She currently works as a hairstylist in Seattle.

Leona Marrs is an LAC in Los Angeles.

The band's song "Something Bigger, Something Brighter" from The New Romance was featured in the video game Rock Band 3.

Nathan Thelen has a new band, Drug Cabin, with Marcus Congleton ex of Ambulance Ltd and they released two albums in early 2015 on 401K Music Inc.

Discography

Studio albums 
 Good Health (2002, Lookout)
 The New Romance (2003, Matador)
 Élan Vital (2006, Matador)

Singles and EPs 
 Pretty Girls Make Graves EP (2001, Dim Mak)
 More Sweet Soul b/w If You Hate Your Friends, You're Not Alone (2001, Sub Pop)
 Sad Girls Por Vida b/w The Getaway (2002, Sound Virus)
 By The Throat b/w Ghosts In The Radio & More Sweet Soul (2002, Hand Held Heart)
 Speakers Push the Air b/w Bring It On Golden Pond & If You Hate Your Friends, You're Not Alone (2002, Dim Mak)
 This Is Our Emergency (2002, Matador)
 All Medicated Geniuses b/w C-30 C-60 C-90 GO! & Magic Lights (2003, Matador)
 Pyrite Pedestal b/w The Lament of St. Bernadette (2006, Matador)
 Live Session EP (2006, Matador)

Videography 
 Speakers Push the Air (2002)
 This Is Our Emergency (2003)
 All Medicated Geniuses (2003)
 The Nocturnal House (2006)

References

External links 
 PGMG on Matador Records
 interview at www.deathrockstar.info

Musical groups from Seattle
Musical groups established in 2001
Musical groups disestablished in 2007
2001 establishments in Washington (state)